This is a list of countries by cereal production in 2020 based on the Food and Agriculture Organization Corporate Statistical Database. The total world cereal production for 2020 was 2,996,142,289 metric tonnes.

In 1961 production was 877 mln tonnes.

Production by country 
The table shows the countries with the largest production of cereals (barley, oats, millet, sorghum, corn, rice, rye and wheat).

World production

References 
		

Lists of countries by production
Cereal